Cratena pawarshindeorum is a species of sea slug, an aeolid nudibranch, a marine gastropod mollusc in the family Facelinidae.

Distribution
This species was described from Maharashtra, India.

References

External links
 Bharate M., Padula V., Apte D. & Shimpi G.G. (2020). Integrative description of two new Cratena species (Mollusca: Nudibranchia) from western India. Zootaxa. 4729(3): 359-370

Facelinidae
Gastropods described in 2020